Leibniz-Institut für innovative Mikroelektronik (English: Innovations for High Performance Microelectronics) is a German research institute located in Frankfurt (Oder), Brandenburg, Germany. The IHP was founded in 1983 as Institut für Halbleiterphysik (English: Institute for Semiconductor Physics), and is today part of the Gottfried Wilhelm Leibniz Scientific Community. The institute has four departments: System Design, Circuit Design, Technology and Materials Research.

See also
 Communicant Semiconductor Technologies
 Halbleiterwerk Frankfurt (Oder) (HFO, tr. "Semiconductor Factory in Frankfurt (Oder)")

References

External links 
 
 IHP Annual Report 2008 (pdf-file)
 Joint Lab IHP / BTU Cottbus

Research institutes in Germany
Leibniz Association
Frankfurt (Oder)
Brandenburg
Science and technology in East Germany